"" (English: 'Views from Ulriken') is the town song of Bergen, Norway. It is also known as "", "", "" and among the public "". The lyrics were written in 1790 by the priest, politician and poet Johan Nordahl Brun when he worked as vicar at Bergen Cathedral (later he became bishop of Bjørgvin). The melody is taken from an old French minuet.
Norwegian composer Johan Halvorsen wrote orchestral variations on the
melody under the name "Bergensiana". A notable performance was by Sissel Kyrkjebø in 1986, when she was 16 years old. It was her big breakthrough. She performed the song during the intermission of the Eurovision Song Contest 1986, which took place in Grieg Hall in Bergen.

Lyrics
 (English: 'Song to Bergen')

by Johan Nordahl Brun
()

I

II

III

IV

V

VI

VII

VIII

IX

English translation of the first verse

I
Holding my newly tuned sitar in my hands;
all my grief left me on the peak of Ulriken.
Thought of the beacons if they would be lighted,
and against foes order out the marching men.
Felt the calm upon me, rejoiced in my spirit,
and reached for my sitar with playful hands.

References

External links
Sissel - Jeg Tok Min Nystemte (Bergensiana) ; Sissel Kyrkjebø sings Bergensiana at Eurovision Song Contest 1986; Hosted by YouTube

Culture in Bergen
Norwegian songs
Sissel Kyrkjebø songs